Erkan Eyibil (born 15 June 2001) is a professional footballer who plays as a midfielder for TFF First League club Gençlerbirliği on loan from Antalyaspor. Born in Germany, Eyibil represents Turkey internationally.

International career
Born in Germany, Eyibil is of Turkish descent. He was a youth international for Germany, before switching to represent the Turkey U21s in 2020.

Career statistics

Club

Notes

References

External links
 
 

2001 births
Living people
Sportspeople from Kassel
Citizens of Turkey through descent
German people of Turkish descent
Turkish footballers
Association football midfielders
German footballers
Turkey youth international footballers
Germany youth international footballers
Eerste Divisie players
Süper Lig players
TFF First League players
Regionalliga players
1. FSV Mainz 05 players
Go Ahead Eagles players
Gençlerbirliği S.K. footballers
VfB Stuttgart II players
German expatriate footballers
Turkish expatriate footballers
German expatriate sportspeople in the Netherlands
Turkish expatriate sportspeople in the Netherlands
Expatriate footballers in the Netherlands